The Barbet is a breed of dog; it is a medium-sized French water dog. It is listed in Group 8 (retrievers, flushing dogs, water dogs) by the Société Centrale Canine, the French Kennel Club and the Fédération Cynologique Internationale (International Canine Federation).

The breed name comes from the French word , which means 'beard'.

Description 

The Barbet is a rare breed. Most Barbets, especially those shown in conformation shows, are black, brown, black and white, or brown and white. It is common to see white chest spots and white paws or legs on black or brown coated dogs.  Fawn (which can range from pearl to cream to gold), and pied variations are re-emerging, but in limited numbers.

Appearance 

The breed stands  for the males,  for females with a tolerance of 1 cm +/-  , and weighs . The barbet is a prototypic water dog, with a long, woolly, and curly coat.

Their coats grow long and must be groomed regularly, otherwise the coat can become matted and the barbet may lose small tufts of hair like tumbleweeds.

The accepted colours of the breed are solid black, grey, brown, fawn, pale fawn, white or more or less pied. All shades of red-fawn and pale fawn are permitted. The shade should, preferably, be the same as the colour of the body. Grey and white are extremely rare; mixed colours (except with white) are considered a fault. The most common colors are solid black, solid brown or both colours with white markings. The birth figures worldwide for 2007 are 176. All born were solid black or solid brown, some with white markings on the chest, chin, and legs.

Temperament

The barbet's personality is described as friendly, joyful, obedient, and intelligent.  They are quick to learn and need lifelong obedience training.  They are great with children, families, and the elderly.  Barbets will bond with their family and prefer to be in the same room with the family at all times.  They need exercise daily to keep the dog in a healthy state of mind and body.

They are capable retrievers for waterfowl hunting. In Germany, the barbet takes part in field trials.

Genetic diseases

Barbets are vulnerable to certain genetic defects. Due to the limited gene pool for this breed, conscientious breeders carefully study pedigrees and select dogs to minimize the chance of genetic diseases. Unfortunately, like many breeds, a growing popularity has encouraged breeding by people who are not knowledgeable about the breed. Of the few health issues that have exhibited themselves; epilepsy, hernias, hip dysplasia and entropion, most problems can be traced back 4–6 generations. Often this was due to limited breeding stock as well as the fact that many matings were with dogs of unknown medical history.

Overall health 

 

Due to the extremely low number of barbets in the world, little is known about long term health issues. Some issues that have exhibited themselves are ear infections, hip dysplasia, hernias, undescended testicles, undershot/overshot bites, entropion, and epilepsy. A study has begun in France about health issues in the Barbet as several breeds have recently "contributed" to the Barbet. Ethical breeders hip score the parents before any matings. A, B, and C hip scores can be used.

The most common issues are ear infections, a problem in most water dog breeds. Ear problems can be minimized by proper ear care. A veterinarian should be consulted if the dog shows signs of an ear infection. The ear should always be clear of any hair, and inspected very regularly.

History 

The barbet connected through the centuries in various capacities, and as a companion dog but more as an all-around working dog. The term barbet became throughout centuries a generic name for a dog with a long, curly, woolly coat. Barbets are best known for being a waterfowl retriever in the marshes, wetlands, and estuaries of France. This is where the expression "muddy as a barbet" came from in the 19th century.

Status in Great Britain (UK)

The first Barbet, a male, was brought into the UK in 2001, although he did not reproduce. In 2007, two unrelated females were brought in from France, having completed their period of quarantine; the majority of Barbets currently in the UK are descendants of these. Since then, further examples of the breed have been imported from France, Netherlands, Canada, Poland, and Sweden. Several UK-born barbets have been used in the breeding programmes of other countries; their offspring can be found in Netherlands, Switzerland, Germany, Sweden, Finland, and Canada.

In April 2018, the Barbet became the 220th breed recognized by The Kennel Club of the UK and the Barbet can now be shown in Import Register classes at all UK dog shows held under The Kennel Club rules. Barbets born in the UK prior to this date were registered in France by the Société Centrale Canine (SCC), a national affiliate of the Fédération Cynologique Internationale (FCI). There are on average only one or two British-born litters born per year. In 2018, there were approximately 140 barbets living in the UK.

The majority of Barbets in the UK are kept as pets, although a small number are used regularly as gun dogs, agility dogs, and for search-and-rescue work; they can also take part in conformation shows in the UK and in FCI-member countries, with two British Barbets achieving French Champion status in 2014.

See also
 Dogs portal
 List of dog breeds

References

External links

FCI breeds
Gundogs
Dog breeds originating in France
Water dogs
Rare dog breeds